Warisaliganj is a town and a nagar parishad in Nawada district in the Indian state of Bihar.

History
Warisaliganj, to the north of Nawada, was founded by Waris Ali khan, brother of Kamgar khan in Mayi family.

Geography
It has an average elevation of 68 meters (223 feet). It is located in one of the most fertile areas of the state, with well-irrigated landscapes due to the Sakri River and its canal system.

Demographics
As of the 2011 India census, Warisaliganj has a population of 34,056 of which 17,874 are males and 16,182 are females. The population of children aged 0–6 is 5,536, 16.26% of the town's total population. The female sex ratio is 905 compared to the state average of 918. The child sex ratio is around 953 compared to the Bihar state average of 935. Its literacy rate is 69.72%, higher than the state average of 61.80%. In Warisaliganj, male literacy is around 77.43% while female literacy is 61.12%. Scheduled Caste (SC) constitutes 11.95% of the town's population while Scheduled Tribe (ST) constitutes 0.20%.

Language

The majority speaks Magahi, with a population of over 80%. followed by Standard Hindi and Urdu speakers.

Religion

the majority of Warisaliganj are Hindus with over 90% of the town's population, followed by significant Muslim population of 7%.

Administration
Warisaliganj is divided into 25 wards for which elections are held every 5 years. The nagar parishad has total administration over housing, supplying basic amenities like water and sewage. It is also authorized to build roads within the town's limits and impose taxes on properties. Warisaliganj is part of Bihar's Warisaliganj legislative constituency. This area also includes Pakri Barawan and Kashichak. It also comes under the Nawada Lok Sabha constituency. Aruna Devi is the area's incumbent MLA, representing the legislative constituency of Warisaliganj.

Economy

The market consists of several big and small merchants. Due to being Indian Railway's, only rack point for freight cars in the whole district, the town has many wholesale spots. Warisaliganj was one of Bihar's famous industrial areas, having sugar and cotton mills until a few years ago. Nowadays, the famous Mohini sugar mill, situated on the outskirts of the town, is closed and shifted to BIADA. Some small-scale industries are still present in different villages nearby.

Places

 
The town itself has a few important places. The Sun Temple (Surya Mandir) is located on the outskirts of the town, near the administrative offices. It is used for celebrating all kinds of religious and spiritual events. The temple also has a recently opened Sanskrit college. There is a picnic spot called "Maafi Garh" in the outskirts of the town, near a referral hospital. It is used by locals on occasions like New Year and Makar Sankranti. Apart from these, the major tourist attractions nearby are Kakolat Falls, Rajgir, Bodhgaya and Pawapuri, all located one to two hours away.

Warisaliganj has many old attractions such as Maafi (which has existed since Dvapara Yuga, and is mentioned in the Mahabharata). Apsarh, Naromurar, Sarkatti are also of historical interest. A village, Dariyapur Parvati, is six miles north of Warisaliganj and has ruins and relics of Kapotika Bodh Bihar. In the center stands a famous temple dedicated to Avalokiteshwer. The village Apsarh is home to historical monuments originating from King Aditaysen.

The village Sarkatti is located 8 km from Warisaliganj and was once a highly decorated estate during the Zamindari system. It is also known for the huge traditional houses owned by the members of the Zamindar family.

Naromurar village is 8 km from the town. It is one of the ancient villages of India having a four-hundred-year-old Thakur Wadi dedicated to Rama and Shiva. A giant 32 foot Hanumanta statue also exists in Thakur Wadiwhich, built by saint Hanuman Das. There are three Gupta period statues of Vishnu in the Makanpur village, privately owned by Ram Ratan Prasad Singh Ratnakar, an eminent scholar and writer.

Transport
The town is well connected to all other parts of the state by roadways and railways. SH 83 passes through Warisaliganj, connecting the Nawada and Sheikhpura districts. The very famous National Highway 20 (which is part of the Asian Highway Network) and Asian Highway 42 are just 11 km by road, connecting Patna and Ranchi. The other areas connected by roads are Nawada, Biharsharif, Patna, Rajgir, Pakri Barawan, and Barbigha. Direct Buses for Patna, Rajgir, Ranchi, Dhanbad, Tata, Begusarai, and Barbigha are also available. State Highway 71 and State Highway 83 meet at Shahpur Mor.

The town is also connected by the Indian Railways B.G. line through the Gaya–Kiul line of the East Central Railway. Warisaliganj Railway Station is an important rack point for freight cars. For local transport, frequent taxi facilities are provided by private vendors in and around the town. Rickshaws and autos are major means of local transport within the town.

Rail Network
 Patna Railway Station → Gaya Railway Station → Warisaliganj Railway Station or Patna Railway Station → Kiul Railway Station → Warisaliganj Railway Station

Road Network
 From Meethapur Bus Stand or Gandhi Maidan Bus Stand, Patna to Warisaliganj
 From Meethapur Bus Stand or Gandhi Maidan Bus Stand, Patna to Nawada, from Nawada to Warisaliganj either by train or by bus
 From Meethapur Bus Stand or Gandhi Maidan Bus Stand, Patna to Bihar Sharif, from Bihar Sharif to Warisaliganj via NH 20

Air
By air, Warisaliganj is well connected to some of the popular airports of Bihar, Jharkhand, and West Bengal:

See also

 Kakolat Falls
 Nalanda
 Rajgir
 Pawapuri
 Nawada
 Naromurar
 Sarkatti

References

External links
 Nawada District official Website

Cities and towns in Nawada district